The 2018 World University Karate Championships was the 11th edition of World University Karate Championships and took place in Kobe, Japan between July 19 and July 22, 2018.

Participating nations

Medalists

Men

Women

Medal count table

See also 

 World University Championships

References 

 2018 FISU World University Karate Championship - Official Results

2018 in karate
World University Championships